Jews, Christians, War and Peace in Egyptian School Textbooks is a March 2004 publication by the Institute for Monitoring Peace and Cultural Tolerance in School Education (IMPACT-SE), known as CMIP at the time of publication. The publication analyzes how Egyptian school textbooks portray war, peace, and the 'Other' -- namely Jews and Christians.

See also
Institute for Monitoring Peace and Cultural Tolerance in School Education

External links
 Egyptian Textbooks: Analysis on Teach Kids Peace
 E/CN.4/Sub.2/2004/NGO/27 of 26 July 2004: "Jihad & Martyrdom as taught in Egyptian primary/preparatory/secondary school text books"

References

Books about education
2004 non-fiction books